The Syriac Orthodox Patriarch of Antioch ܦܛܪܝܪܟܐ ܕܐܢܛܝܘܟܝܐ is the bishop of Antioch, and head of the Syriac Orthodox Church (Syriac: ܥܺܕܬܳܐ ܣܽܘ̣ܪܝܳܝܬܳܐ ܬܪܺܝܨܰܬ ܫܽܘ̣ܒ̣ܚܳܐ). He is the Head of the Holy Synod of the Syriac Orthodox Church, the highest authority of the Syriac Orthodox Church.

The position of the Patriarch of Antioch was established and first held by Peter the Apostle (Syriac: ܫܹܡܥܘܿܢ ܟܹ݁ܐܦ݂ܵܐ Šemʿōn Kēp̄ā). The Patriarch of Antioch sits on the Holy Apostolic See at Antioch. The Patriarchate of Antioch is part of the Pentarchy of the Christian Church. He is the Bishop of Antioch, and considered as Primus Inter Pares or First Among the Equals/Bishops of the Diocese of the East.

History of the Patriarchate 
The Church of Antioch was established by Peter in AD 32.

When Peter left Antioch, to go to Rome (where he would establish the Church of Rome and later die), he appointed Evodius as bishop. Evodius was succeeded by Ignatius, and so on.

During the Synod of Nicaea, the Bishop of Antioch became one of the Patriarchs of the Pentarchy (along with fellow Patriarchate of Alexandria). After the Council at Chalcedon, Christianity split into the Catholic-Orthodox and the Oriental Orthodox, thus splitting the church. The Patriarch of Antioch (Severus) and Pope of Alexandria(Dioscorus) led the Oriental Orthodox Church, which followed a miaphysite view of Christology and the Pope of Rome led the Catholic Church along with the Patriarch of Constantinople, which followed a dyophysite view on Christology.

Severus, the Patriarch of Antioch, was exiled to Egypt by the Emperor of the Byzantine Empire for following the Oriental Orthodox Church. The Catholic group of the Church of Antioch (later Greek Orthodox Church of Antioch), accepted the new Patriarch, appointed by the Pope of Rome, as their new Patriarch, after the exile of Severus. The Syriac Orthodox Church, or the Oriental Orthodox group of the Church of Antioch, continued to accept Severus as Patriarch until his death in AD 538.

In AD 518 the Patriarchate was forced to flee from Antioch and it continues move from place to place until it moved to Dayro d-Mor Hanayo (Kurkmo Dayro, or Deir az-Za'faran), in Mardin, Turkey in 1106.

By AD 544, the Syriac Orthodox Church had only three bishops remaining. During this time, a priest named Jacob traveled to Constantinople to ask Empress Theodora's (who was a Miaphisite herself), the daughter of a Syriac Orthodox priest, consent to be ordained as a bishop. He was ordained as Mor Jacob Baradeus (Mor Ya'qub Burdono ܝܥܩܘܒ ܒܘܪܕܥܝܐ), by Pope Theodosius I, Pope of Alexandria and he traveled to many places to revive the Syriac Orthodox Church. He managed to consecrate 27 bishops, and hundreds of priests and deacons for the church. He led the consecration of Mor Segius of Tella as the Patriarch of Antioch (first Patriarch of the independent Syriac Orthodox Church) in 544. It is after this bishohp that the Syriac Orthodox Church in India gets the name "Jacobite" (Jacobite Syrian Christian Church) He revived the Miaphisite belief in the Church of Antioch throughout persecution.

In 1662, the vacant patriarchate was filled by individuals who aligned themselves with the Catholic Church. Andrew Akijan was elected in that year, and was succeeded by another Catholic in Gregory Peter VI Shahbaddin. The non-Catholic Syriac party elected the rival Abdulmasih I, Shahbaddin's uncle, as a competing patriarch. Upon Shahbaddin's death in 1702, the Catholic line died out for several decades until the Holy Synod in 1782 elected Michael III Jarweh, who again aligned the Syriacs with the pope. Following a period of violence and intrigue, the non-Catholic party was again recognized with their own patriarch and the Catholic line continued independently as the Syriac Catholic Church.

The Syriac Orthodox Church continued to be persecuted under the Arabs, Mongols, Crusaders, Mamluks, and Ottomans. During 1915 (known as the Sayfo/ܣܝܦ or "the year of the sword" in Syriac), more than 250,000 Syriac Orthodox Christians in the Middle East were wiped out by the Ottoman Empire. Many Syriac Orthodox Villages were emptied, and historical monasteries and churches were destroyed. During World War I, the Patriarchate was again forced to flee by the Ottoman Empire and the patriarchate was forced to flee to Homs, Syria in 1953, and later, Damascus, in 1957.

The Syriac Orthodox Church continues to grow to this day under the Patriarchate. The Syriac Orthodox Church, along with the rest of the Oriental Orthodox Church, is now in sacramental cooperation with the Catholic Church, and is working on a communion with the Eastern Orthodox Church and the Catholic Church.

Authority of the Patriarch 
 The Patriarch is considered the legitimate successor of Peter the Apostle, on the Holy Throne of Antioch.

The patriarch, as first among the bishops, convenes the Holy Synod of the Syriac Orthodox Church and presides over the meeting.

The patriarch, has the authority to consecrate the Maphrian (also known as the Catholicos of India) and bishops who are elected by the Holy Synod, but he has to be assisted by two other bishops (by his invitation). He is the only one authorized to conduct the consecration of a bishop. The Maphrian and other bishops can do it with the consent of the Patriarch. He is also the only one that can consecrate the Holy Chrism (Mooron).

The patriarch signs all documents with other denominations and he alone is in charge of external relations with other churches. The patriarch dispatches clergy on ecclesiastical and cultural works.

When the Patriarch visits a diocese, he sits on the Cathedral seat of the church. The bishops are not allowed to carry their pastoral staff and wear their red vestment in front of the patriarch (bishops usually wear a red vestment while travelling in their diocese) in respect to the Apostolic See.

The Patriarch has the right to change, introduce, or abolish church rites. All Syriac Orthodox monasteries are in the hands of the Patriarch and he alone has the authority to appoint its care takers.

Requirements and Restrictions for the Patriarch 

Requirements:

 The patriarch must be a member of the Syriac Orthodox Church.
 The patriarch must be over 40 years old.
 The patriarch can't be married.
 Previously, the patriarch was chosen from among the monks, and was then consecrated as a bishop, and then elevated to the Holy See of Antioch. In modern times, the patriarch is chosen from the bishops and is elevated to the Holy See.
 The patriarch must be elected by the Holy Synod, led by the Maphrian and the Patriarchal Locum Tenens, by all the bishops who are able to vote. If a bishop is not able to be present, he can send a vote through a letter. If he does not do this, his vote is canceled.
 Patriarch-elect has to be of Middle-Eastern origin, because he is the bishop of Antioch. 
 The patriarch must keep the Syriac Orthodox faith strong and work to preserve it.
 The patriarch must be elevated by the Holy Synod, led by Maphrian (Catholicos of India), or if not present, the Patriarchal Locum Tenens, along with all the bishops of the Syriac Orthodox Church that are able to be present.

Restrictions:

 The patriarch must give all his assets to the Syriac Orthodox Church.
 The Holy See must not be vacant for more than 30 days unless there is an emergency.
 During a Holy Synod meeting, the patriarch must inform the Holy Synod about everything he has accomplished since their last meeting.

Titles of the Patriarch 
The following are a list of titles of the Patriarch of Antioch The official title of the Patriarch of Antioch is:

His Holiness/Thrice Blessed Moran Mor Ignatius (Monastic Name) (Roman Numeral to distinguish from other Patriarchs of the same name) Patriarch of Antioch and All the East, and Supreme Head of the Universal Syriac Orthodox Church.

ܩܕܝܫܘܬܗ/ ܬܠܝܬܝ̈ ܛܘܒܐ̈ ܕܡܪܢ ܡܪܝ ܐܝܓܢܛܝܘܣ ... ܦܛܪܝܪܟܐ ܕܐܢܛܝܘܟܝܐ ܘܕܟܠܗ̇ ܡܕܢܚܐ ܘܪܝܫܐ ܓܘܢܝܐ ܕܥܕܬܐ ܣܘܪܝܝܬܐ ܬܪܝܨܬ ܫܘܒܚܐ ܒܟܠܗ̇ ܬܐܒܠ

Qaddišuṯeh/Tlithoy Tube ḏ-Moran Mor Iḡnaṭius ... Paṭriarḵo ḏ-Anṭiuḵia waḏ-Kuloh Maḏĕnḥo w-Rišo Gawonoyo ḏ-ʿItto Suryoyto Triṣaṯ Šuḇḥo ḇ-Kuloh Tiḇel

Other titles for the patriarch include:

 His Holiness ( Qaddišuṯeh)
 Thriced Blessed "Thrice Blessed" ( Tlithoy Ṭuḇe) (Not commonly used for modern Patriarchs)
 Mor Ignatius (ܐܝܓܢܐܛܝܘ)
 Prince Patriarch of Antioch and All the East 
 Moran (Syriac: ܡܪܢ) (Literally translates to My Lord) (title is usually reserved for Jesus Christ, but sometimes (not traditionally) used for the Patriarch)
 Mor (Syriac: ܡܪܝ)(Literally translates to Lord)(used in the title of all Syriac Orthodox Bishops)
 Aboon(ܐܒܘܢ) (Translates to Our Father) (used by most clergy in the Syriac Orthodox Church) (used in the title of the Maphrian as Aboon Mor ܐܒܘܢ ܡܪܝ, or Our Father, Lord)
 Moran Mor (Syriac: ܡܪܢ ܡܪܝ) (Literally translates to My Lord, Lord)
 First Among the Equals 
 Supreme Head of the Syriac Orthodox Church (Syriac: ܪܝܫܐ ܓܘܢܝܐ ܕܥܺܕܬܳܐ ܣܽܘ̣ܪܝܳܝܬܳܐ ܬܪܺܝܨܰܬ ܫܽܘ̣ܒ̣ܚܳܐ Rišo Gawonoyo ḏ-Idto Suryoyto Triṣaṯ Šuḇḥo)
 Supreme Head of the Universal Syriac Orthodox Church (Syriac: ܪܝܫܐ ܓܘܢܝܐ ܕܥܕܬܐ ܣܘܪܝܝܬܐ ܬܪܝܨܬ ܫܘܒܚܐ ܒܟܠܗ̇ ܬܐܒܠ Rišo Gawonoyo ḏ-ʿItto Suryoyto Triṣaṯ Šuḇḥo ḇ-Kuloh Tiḇel)
 Successor of Saint Peter
 Pontiff (from Latin pontifex) (used by all Patriarchs in the Pentarchy) 
 Patriarch of Antioch (Syriac: ܦܛܪܝܪܟܐ ܕܐܢܛܝܘܟܝܐ Paṭriarḵo ḏ-Anṭiuḵia)
 Bishop of Antioch
 Patriarch of Antioch and All the East (Syriac: ܦܛܪܝܪܟܐ ܕܐܢܛܝܘܟܝܐ ܘܕܟܠܗ̇ ܡܕܢܚܐ Paṭriarḵo ḏ-Anṭiuḵia waḏ-Kuloh)
 Patriarch of the Syriac Orthodox Church (Syriac: ܦܛܪܝܪܟܐ ܕܥܺܕܬܳܐ ܣܽܘ̣ܪܝܳܝܬܳܐ ܬܪܺܝܨܰܬ ܫܽܘ̣ܒ̣ܚܳܐ Paṭriarḵo ḏ-Idto Suryoyto Triṣaṯ Šuḇḥo)

References

Bibliography
 

Syriac Orthodox Patriarchs of Antioch